Antti Ahlström (7 November 1827 – 10 May 1896) founded the Ahlstrom Corporation. He was one of Finland's influential and wealthy 19th-century businessman. In addition, Ahlström was an industrialist, ship owner, patron, commercial counselor and legislator.

Biography

Antti Ahlström was born in Merikarvia, and was a socially active citizen, representing the bourgeoisie of the Town of Pori at the Diet of the Estates in 1877–1878 and in 1894. He was awarded the highly distinguished honorary title of Commercial Counsellor in 1881. Ahlström and his wife made considerable donations to public schools and to public education to further the national interest, and to the arts, for instance to the Finnish National Theatre and the Finnish National Opera. The Ahlströms were also patrons to several Finnish artists, including Akseli Gallen-Kallela.

Between 1866 and 1874, Antti Ahlström's big business was shipping; he became the largest shipowner in Pori in 1871. It was in shipping that he earned the starting capital which he subsequently used to build his sawmill empire.

The purchase of the manor and iron works in Noormarkku in 1870 was a milestone in Antti Ahlström's career: the purchase sealed his status as an important businessman and a ‘lord of the manor’. One month after the deed of sale was signed, his wife Margaretha Ahlström died of a sudden illness. In the following year, Antti Ahlström married again, this time to a woman 20 years his junior, Eva Holmström.

Ahlström's business grew rapidly through major acquisitions, such as the iron works in Kauttua, Leineperi and Strömfors and the sawmills in Haminaholma, Suursaari and Tampere.

When Antti Ahlström died on 10 May 1896, in Helsinki, he left behind a fortune estimated at 11,4 million Finnish marks, which was Finland's largest at the time. Although difficult to estimate, this would likely be the equivalent of billions of Euro today.

See also
Ahlstrom
Ahlström – Gullichsen family

References

External links
Biografiskt lexikon för Finland (BLF): Antti Ahlström 
Ahlström, Antti Kansallisbiografia 
Vierivä kivi opera

1827 births
1896 deaths
People from Merikarvia
People from Turku and Pori Province (Grand Duchy of Finland)
Members of the Diet of Finland
19th-century Finnish businesspeople
Businesspeople from the Russian Empire
Finnish patrons of the arts
Finnish industrialists